William M. Garth (September 12, 1863 - June 15, 1934) was an American trainer, owner, and breeder of Thoroughbred racehorses best known as the winning trainer of 1920 Kentucky Derby victor Paul Jones for owner Ral Parr. He also trained Martingale to a second-place finish behind Zev in the 1923 Kentucky Derby.

Garth family background
William M. Garth was a descendant of the prosperous family of Thomas Garth, the first of the Garth family to settle in Albemarle County, Virginia in 1762. One of several in the family named William, he owned Ingleside Stock Farm which had its own training track and a 5,000 square-foot horse barn. The property was on Garth Road outside Charlottesville, Virginia which was named for his family. In 1923 he purchased 1911 Kentucky Derby winner Meridian to stand as a sire at his stud farm.

William Garth is buried in the Garth Chapel Cemetery on Garth Road in Owensville, Virginia.

His son, J. Woods Garth, followed in his father's footsteps and is best known as the trainer of Snob II, a multiple stakes winner who ran second to Pillory in the 1922 Belmont Stakes.

References

1863 births
1934 deaths
American horse trainers
Sportspeople from Virginia